The Egherul Mare is a left tributary of the river Tur in Romania and Hungary. It discharges into the Tur near Túrricse.

References

Rivers of Romania
Rivers of Hungary
Rivers of Satu Mare County
International rivers of Europe